The 2012 leadership election of the Union for a Popular Movement (UMP), a political party in France was held on 18 November 2012. It renewed the leadership structures of the UMP following Nicolas Sarkozy's defeat in the 2012 presidential election and the party's defeat in the subsequent legislative election. The disputed results led to the first open crisis in the UMP since its creation in 2002.

Incumbent General Secretary Jean-François Copé defeated former Prime Minister François Fillon.

Organization
While the UMP's two previous congresses in 2002 and 2004 had been held at the Bourget, there was no physical congress organized in 2012 and the congress was decentralized in each departmental federation of the UMP.

Presidency of the UMP
Nicolas Sarkozy was the UMP's last president, between 2004 and 2007. Following his election to the presidency of France in 2007, the UMP modified its statutes to create a collegial presidency led by a secretary-general during the duration of his term in office. His defeat meant that the UMP needed to hold a new presidential election.

Candidates seeking to run for the party presidency needed to win the endorsements of at least 3% of party members (as of 30 June 2012), or  members, from at least 10 different departmental federations. Each candidate created a "ticket" with two other party members for the offices of vice-president and secretary-general of the UMP.

Candidacies, including all endorsements, were due before 18 September 2012.

Presidential candidates

Unsuccessful presidential candidates
Henri Guaino, deputy of the Yvelines's 3rd constituency, declared his candidacy on 3 September.
 Nathalie Kosciusko-Morizet, mayor of Longjumeau, deputy for the Essonne's 4th constituency and former cabinet minister, announced that she had about 7000 endorsements as of 18 September and criticized the candidacy requirements.
 Bruno Le Maire, deputy for the Eure's 1st constituency and former cabinet minister, also claimed around 7200 endorsements on 18 September.
 Julien Amador, Dominique Hamdad-Vitré, Philippe Herlin and Jean-Michel Simonian, grassroots party members could never hope to win the required endorsements.

Dropped out
 François Baroin, mayor of Troyes, deputy for the Aube's 3rd constituency and former cabinet minister did not, ultimately, run and endorsed Fillon.
 Xavier Bertrand, mayor Saint-Quentin, deputy for the Aisne's 2nd constituency and former cabinet minister announced that he was dropping out onf 16 September although he claimed 8200 endorsements. He claimed he was dropping out to run in the 2016 primaries which will nominate the party's candidate in the 2017 presidential election.
 Dominique Dord, mayor of Aix-les-Bains, deputy for the Savoie's 1st constituency and treasurer of the UMP announced his candidacy in July 2012 but dropped out on 22 August 2012, lacking endorsements.
 Christian Estrosi, mayor of Nice, deputy for the Alpes-Maritimes' 5th constituency and formed cabinet minister. He dropped out in September 2012 and endorsed Fillon.
 Alain Juppé, mayor of Bordeaux, former president of the UMP (2002-2004) and former Prime Minister (1995-1997) was seen as a compromise candidate to prevent a Copé-Fillon battle. In July 2012 he announced that he would not run if Jean-François Copé and François Fillon ran and that he would not endorse any candidate.

Movements

The UMP's original statutes in 2002 allowed for the organization of formal factions or movements within the party, to represent the various political families of which it was made up. However, fearing leadership rivalries and divisions, Juppé, Chirac and later Sarkozy 'postponed' the creation of such organized movements indefinitely. Nevertheless, prior to the organizations of formal "movements" in November 2012, there existed informal groupings of like-minded members, either through associations, political clubs, associated political parties or even informal factions.

Prior to Sarkozy's defeat on 6 May, the UMP's secretary-general Jean-François Copé announced that he supported the creation of internal "movements" within the party and the organization of primaries for the next presidential election.

Jean-François Copé allowed for the organization of formal movements within the party following the congress. According to the party's statutes, motions backed by at least 10 parliamentarians from 10 departmental federations and which obtain at least 10% support from members at a congress are recognized as movements. They are granted financial autonomy by way of a fixed grant and additional funding in proportion to the votes they obtained; but the sum of funds transferred by the party to its movements can be no larger than 30% of the annual public subsidies the UMP receives from the state.

Valid motions (declarations of principles)
Six motions representing various ideological tendencies within the party ran to be recognized as official movements following the November 2012 congress.

The Strong Right (La Droite forte) led by Geoffroy Didier and Guillaume Peltier
The Social Right (La Droite sociale) led by Laurent Wauquiez
Modern and Humanist France (France moderne et humaniste) led by Luc Chatel, Jean Léonetti, Jean-Pierre Raffarin and Marc Laffineur
Gaullism, a way forward for France (Le Gaullisme, une voie d'avenir pour la France) led by Michèle Alliot-Marie, Henri Guaino, Roger Karoutchi and Patrick Ollier
The Popular Right (La Droite populaire) led by Thierry Mariani
The Box of Ideas (La Boîte à idées) led by Maël de Calan, Enguerrand Delannoy, Matthieu Schlesinger and Pierre-Emmanuel Thiard

Charter of Values
Members were also called to approve or reject amendments to the party's charter of values.

Campaign
The campaign between Fillon and Copé lasted two months. Fillon had a strong lead in polls of UMP 'sympathizers' (as opposed to actual members, who would be the only eligible voters) and was backed by most UMP parliamentarians while Copé claimed he was the candidate of party activists rather than party 'barons'. However, Copé remained as secretary-general and retained control of the party machinery.

While Fillon's campaign was regarded as more consensual, moderate and centre-right; Copé campaigned as the candidate of the droite décomplexée ('uninhibited right') and introduced issues such as anti-white racism. However, both candidates received support from moderate and conservative members of the party and their main differences were in rhetoric, style and temperament. Copé, again, appeared more militant and activist, saying that he would support and participate in street demonstrations while Fillon disagreed with his rival.

Results

COCOE results
The vote on 18 November saw high turnout but was quickly marred by allegations of irregularities and potential fraud on both sides. Both candidates proclaimed victory within 20 minutes of each other on the night of the vote.

24 hours later, the control commission in charge of the vote (COCOE) announced Copé's victory by only 98 votes.

While Fillon initially conceded defeat, by 21 November his campaign claimed victory anew, with a 26-vote advantage over Copé. Fillon's campaign argued that the COCOE had failed to take into account votes cast in three overseas federations.

CONARE/CNR results
Alain Juppé accepted to lead a mediation between both candidates on 23 November, but it failed within two days. Fillon's announced "precautionary seizure" of ballots cast "to protect them from tampering or alteration" and threatened to take the matter to court.

On 26 November, the party appeals commission (CONARE or CNR) - led by a close supporter of Copé - decided in Copé's favour and rejected Fillon's arguments. The CNR voided the results in three precincts favourable to Fillon (two in Nice, the other was New Caledonia) and reintegrated the results from Mayotte and Wallis-et-Futuna.

Movements

Crisis

On 27 November, 72 filloniste parliamentarians in the National Assembly announced the creation of a new parliamentary group, the Rassemblement-UMP, led by Fillon. Copé took up former President Nicolas Sarkozy's proposal of organizing a referendum on a revote, but he saw the creation of the dissident filloniste group as a casus belli and took back his proposal. Luc Chatel, the new vice-president and a Copé supporter, later announced that he supported a new presidential vote and a modification of party statutes. The next day, Copé announced that he favoured organizing a referendum the modification of party statutes and a reduction of his own term as president to two years (until November 2014); while Fillon welcomed the "consensus on the organization of a new election" he rejected his rival's timeline and called for a new election before 2014. 'Unaligned' members of the UMP led by Bruno Le Maire and Nathalie Kosciusko-Morizet appealed for the organization of a new election in the spring of 2013 and a reform of the party statutes.

Resolution

Both rivals reached an agreement at the end of December 2012, with Copé agreeing to the organization of a new election and a modification of party statutes while Fillon agreed to dissolve his parliamentary group.

The party's leadership was reorganized in January 2013 to accommodate Copé and Fillon's supporters: Laurent Wauquiez and Valérie Pécresse joined Luc Chatel and Michèle Tabarot as vice-president and secretary-general respectively. Christian Estrosi, Gérard Longuet, Henri de Raincourt (pro-Fillon), Jean-Claude Gaudin, Brice Hortefeux and Roger Karoutchi (pro-Copé) also became vice-presidents. Other positions in the party hierarchy were divided between supporters of both candidates. New leaders were also nominated in February 2013.

References

Election, 2012
2012 elections in France
Political party leadership elections in France
Union for a Popular Movement leadership election